Ebenezer Kofi Assifuah-Inkoom (born 3 July 1993) is a Ghanaian professional footballer who plays as a forward for Malaysia Super League club Kedah Darul Aman.

Before moving to Swiss club Sion, he played for Liberty Professionals in his home country of Ghana. Assifuah has been described as a striker with power and scoring ability. Although he naturally is right-footed, he has successfully used his left foot.

Assifuah is a former Ghana international. At youth level, he played for the Ghana U20s. In 2016, he won this first cap for the Ghana national team, and was selected for the 2017 Africa Cup of Nations.

Club career

Early career 
Assifuah began his career with the Division One team Sekondi Eleven Wise where he attracted attention after scoring eight times in the Ghanaian Division One League.

At the end of the 2011–12 Poly Tank Division One League, and after his success in the games of the 2013 African U-20 Championship qualification, Assifuah was highly sought after by top teams in Ghana including Ebusua Dwarfs.

Liberty Professionals 
he signed a three-year contract with premiership side Liberty Professionals. He took some time to settle at Liberty Professionals after his move from Sekondi Eleven Wise. On the 2012 Boxing Day, he rediscovered his form and scored four goals against Berekum Chelsea. Prior to the end of the African Youth Championship, Assifuah had attracted the attention scouts of Italian Serie A side Udinese, and a move was deemed likely.

FC Sion 
After being top goal scorer at the FIFA U-20 Championship 2013 in Turkey he moved to the Swiss side Sion signing a five-year contract. Assifuah scored his first goal in the Swiss Super League in his second game against leaders Basel on 28 September 2013. On 1 October 2015, Assisfuah was in the headlines at Anfield after scoring the equaliser for his team in the Eurpoa League match against Liverpool, that was his debut goal in any European club competition. In the 2014–15 Swiss Cup final, He played 75 minutes of the match as FC Sion scored FC Basel 3–0 to win the cup. In 2017 he left the club after playing for the club for four years.

Le Havre 
Assifuah joined Le Havre AC on 18 January 2017 and signed a three-and-half-year deal. In June 2020, he left club after playing a total of 68 matches in all competitions for the club amid several injuries whilst playing for the Ligue 2 side.

Pau 
On 5 June 2020, he signed on a two-year deal contract with newly promoted Ligue 2 side Pau .  He signed for the club upon the request of new coach Didier Tholot, with whom he played under at Sion in Switzerland between 2014 and 2016.

On 9 March 2022, Assifuah suffered a serious anterior cruciate ligament injury, which ruled him out for the rest of the 2021-22 season. In July 2022, Assifuah's contract with Pau terminated and both parties decided to path ways.

International career

African Youth Championship
Assifuah was part of the Ghana Under-20 national team during the qualification rounds for the 2013 African U-20 Championship. He scored Ghana's second goal against Uganda national under-20 football team in October 2012. In 2013, coach Sellas Tetteh called him up, along with Liberty Professional teammates Kennedy Ashia and Kwame Boahene, for the Ghana Under-20 national team ahead of the 2013 tournament in Algeria. During the competition he scored in every group match game which helped push the team into the finals with Egypt and Ghana finished as runners up of the competition. With Egyptian player Kahraba he was 2nd joint top scorer of the tournament.

FIFA U-20 Championship, Turkey 2013
Assifuah was a member of the Ghana Under-20 national team that took part in the 2013 FIFA U-20 tournament in Turkey. He finished the tournament as the leading goal scorer with 6 goals.

Senior Ghana National Team
Assifuah made his first appearance for the senior Ghana national football team as a starter in 0–0 Africa Cup of Nations qualifying tie with Mozambique on 27 March 2016. Later he was selected for 2017 Africa Cup of Nations, but remained on the bench throughout while his team finished in fourth place.

Honours 
Sion
 Swiss Cup: 2014-15

Ghana U20
 FIFA U-20 World Cup third place: 2013
African U-20 Championship runner-up: 2013

Individual
 FIFA U-20 World Cup Golden Boot: 2013

See also
Gifty Assifuah (born 2000), his sister, also a footballer

References

1993 births
Living people
Footballers from Accra
Association football forwards
Ghanaian footballers
Ghana international footballers
Ghana under-20 international footballers
Ghanaian expatriate footballers
Liberty Professionals F.C. players
FC Sion players
Le Havre AC players
Pau FC players
Swiss Super League players
Ligue 2 players
2013 African U-20 Championship players
Expatriate footballers in Switzerland
Expatriate footballers in France
Ghanaian expatriate sportspeople in Switzerland
2017 Africa Cup of Nations players